Ark: The Animated Series is an upcoming animated fantasy television series based on the video game Ark: Survival Evolved. Its release is expected sometime in 2023.

Premise
Helena Walker is an australian Paleontologist in the 21st century, becomes a grieving widow after the death of her wife, Victoria. One night, after drinking, she wakes up suddenly to find herself in the middle of a vast ocean. Escaping from a large, charging shark, she soon washes up ashore on a strange island. Once there, she befriends a wild Dodo, only to discover it was being hunted by a male tribe hunter named Bob. After discovering the two arrived to this world in the same manner, Bob teaches Helena the way of survival.

With this strange new world filled with Dinosaurs, strange technology, and warring tribes, Helena will do what it takes to survive and hopefully find a way to return to her world.

Characters
 Helena Walker (voiced by Madeleine Madden) - An Australian paleontologist from the 21st century who recently woke up on the ARK.
 General Gaius Marcellus Nerva (voiced by Gerard Butler) - A brutal despot of Ancient Rome.
 Alasie (voiced by Devery Jacobs) - A peppy Inuit teen from the 17th century who is finding out where she fits in on the ARK.
 The Gladiatrix (voiced by Cissy Jones) - A commander in an army, led by Nerva, who is said to be formidable.
 Deborah Walker (voiced by Deborah Mailman) - The mother of Helena and an archivist for Aboriginal Australians in the 21st century.
 Thunder Comes Charging (voiced by Zahn McClarnon) - A Lakota warrior from the 19th century who heads a community on the Ark.
 Senator Lucius Cassius Virilis (voiced by Malcolm McDowell) - A conniving aristocrat during the reign of Augustus Caesar. 
 Chava (voiced by Juliet Mills) - A member of the village council and healer with much wisdom.
 Victoria Walker (voiced by Elliot Page) - Helena's wife and a humanitarian aid worker who is very idealistic.
 Queen Sigrid (voiced by Ragga Ragnars) - A Viking warlord from the 10th century who is very bellicose.
 Sir Edmund Rockwell (voiced by David Tennant) - The main series antagonist and scientist from the 19th century who is egocentric and has mysterious ambitions.
 The Captain (voiced by Alan Tudyk) - A buccaneer who makes a hefty profit as he sailed around the ARK.
 Bob (voiced by Karl Urban) - A recent arrival to the ARK.
 Henry Townsend (voiced by Jeffrey Wright) - A spy for the Patriots in the American Revolutionary War and an American watchmaker from the 18th century.
 Mei-yin Li (voiced by Michelle Yeoh) - A Chinese rebel leader from the 3rd century who is feared throughout the Ark as the "Beast Queen".
 Han Li (voiced by Ron Yuan) - A Chinese rebel leader from the 3rd century who is Mei-yin's brother.
 Kor the Prophet (voiced by Russell Crowe) - An eccentric character who comes from before recorded history and claims to be a "dino-whisperer".
 Santiago (voiced by Vin Diesel) - A pilot of a Mek from the 24th century and freedom fighter.
 Cassia Virila (voiced by Monica Bellucci)

Production
In December 2020, the series was announced with a trailer during the 2020 Video Game Awards, along with the cast that included Gerard Butler, David Tennant, Michelle Yeoh, Jeffrey Wright, Zahn McClarnon, Elliot Page, Karl Urban, Malcolm McDowell, Alan Tudyk, Russell Crowe, and Vin Diesel, who will also serve as an executive producer.

The creators of the Ark: Survival Evolved video game, Jeremy Stieglitz and Jesse Rapczak, are the series creators, while Marguerite Bennett and Kendall Deacon Davis are series writers. In 2020 it was announced that Jay Oliva will direct the series, which will consist of 14 thirty-minute episodes that develop the game's world, and that two seasons were in production. In June 2022, the series entered post-production, with Monica Bellucci and Dee Bradley Baker added to the voice cast. In December 2022, with the release of a new trailer, it was revealed Butler and Crowe would also be executive producers.

Gareth Coker is the composer for the series. Oliva was also confirmed as showrunner for Ark: The Animated Series, while Kendall Deacon Davis was noted a lead writer of the series.

Release 
The show was initially set to release sometime in 2022, but the second trailer confirmed that the series is planned for a release in 2023. The platform the show will be released on has not been announced.

References

External links
 

Upcoming animated television series
Animated series based on video games
American adult animated web series
2020s American adult animated television series
2020s American LGBT-related animated television series
Animated fantasy television series
Anime-influenced animation
Anime-influenced Western animation
Anime-influenced Western animated television series
Animated television series about dinosaurs